In enzymology, a cytidylate kinase is an enzyme that catalyzes the chemical reaction

ATP + (d)CMP  ADP + (d)CDP

Thus, the two substrates of this enzyme are ATP and dCMP, whereas its two products are ADP and dCDP.

This enzyme belongs to the family of transferases, specifically those transferring phosphorus-containing groups (phosphotransferases) with a phosphate group as acceptor.  The systematic name of this enzyme class is ATP:CMP phosphotransferase. Other names in common use include: deoxycytidylate kinase, deoxycytidylate kinase, CMP kinase, CTP:CMP phosphotransferase, dCMP kinase, deoxycytidine monophosphokinase, UMP-CMP kinase, ATP:UMP-CMP phosphotransferase, and pyrimidine nucleoside monophosphate kinase.  This enzyme participates in pyrimidine metabolism.

References

Further reading 

 
 
 

EC 2.7.4
Enzymes of known structure